The Thomas 35, also called the T-35, is an American sailboat that was designed by Graham & Schlageter as a racer-cruiser and first built in 1988.

Production
The design was initially built by Thomas Marine of Arlington Heights, Illinois, starting in 1988 and later by Tartan Marine in Painesville, Ohio, United States, but it is now out of production.

Design
The Thomas 35 is a recreational keelboat, built predominantly of fiberglass, with wood trim. It has a fractional sloop, with some later production boats supplied with a masthead sloop rig instead. The hull has a raked stem, a reverse transom, transom, an internally mounted spade-type rudder controlled by a tiller and a fixed fin keel. It displaces  and carries  of lead ballast.

The design has sleeping accommodation for six people, with a double "V"-berth in the bow cabin, two straight settee berths in the main cabin and two aft cabins with a single berths. The galley is located on the port side at the companionway ladder. The galley is "L"-shaped and is equipped with a two-burner stove, an ice box and a sink. A navigation station is opposite the galley, on the starboard side. The head is located just aft of the bow cabin on the port side and includes a shower.

For sailing downwind the design may be equipped with a symmetrical spinnaker.

Operational history
The boat was named as Sailing World's Boat of the Year for 1990.

See also
List of sailing boat types

References

Keelboats
1980s sailboat type designs
Sailing yachts
Sailboat type designs by Graham & Schlageter
Sailboat types built by Tartan Marine
Sailboat types built by Thomas Marine